The 2017 Indiana State Sycamores football team represented Indiana State University in the 2017 NCAA Division I FCS football season. They played their home games at Memorial Stadium as a member of the Missouri Valley Football Conference. They finished the season 0–11, 0–8 in MVFC play to finish in last place.

Prior to the season, on January 23, 2017, Curt Mallory was hired as the 21st head coach in program history. He was previously the defensive backs coach and pass defense coordinator at Wyoming.

Previous season
The Sycamores finished the 2016 season 4–7, 2–6 in MVFC play to finish tied for eighth place.

Schedule

References

Indiana State
Indiana State Sycamores football seasons
College football winless seasons
Indiana State Sycamores football